{{Taxobox
| image = 
| image_caption = 
| regnum = Animalia
| phylum = Arthropoda
| classis = Insecta
| ordo = Lepidoptera
| familia = Pyralidae
| genus = Hypsotropa
| species = H. adumbratella
| binomial = Hypsotropa adumbratella| binomial_authority = Ragonot, 1888
| synonyms = 
}}Hypsotropa adumbratella is a species of snout moth in the genus Hypsotropa''. It was described by Ragonot in 1888, and is known from South Africa.

References

Endemic moths of South Africa
Moths described in 1888
Anerastiini